"No Future in the Past" is a song written by Gilles Luka and Laura Mayne and recorded by the French R&B singer Nâdiya and American R&B singer Kelly Rowland for Nâdiya's fourth studio album Électron Libre. The song was released to radio stations near the end of September 2008, a digital release followed in early October, and had a physical release in November 2008.

Music video
The futuristic themed music video was shot in Miami, Florida during July 2008, directed by Thierry Vergnes. It debuted to be aired on October 27 on the French music channel NRJ Hits.

Charts

References

2008 singles
Kelly Rowland songs
Nâdiya songs
Macaronic songs
Female vocal duets
2008 songs